This is a list of members of the Victorian Legislative Council between 1999 and 2002. As half of the Legislative Council faced election at each general election until 2006, one half of these members were elected at the 1996 state election, while the other half was elected at the 1999 state election.

Members of the Parliament of Victoria by term
21st-century Australian politicians
20th-century Australian politicians